The women's 800 metre freestyle event at the 1998 Commonwealth Games took place at KL Sports City.

Records
Prior to this competition, the existing world, Commonwealth and Games records were as follows:

Results

Heats

Final

References

Commonwealth Games
Common